201 Portage (formerly TD Centre, Canwest Place, and CanWest Global Place) is an office tower at the northwest intersection of Portage and Main in Winnipeg, Manitoba, Canada. It is the 2nd tallest building in Winnipeg and in the province of Manitoba.

History 
Announced as TD Centre in November 1987, the 33-storey building was constructed between 1988 and 1990 by the Toronto Dominion Bank for $38,000,000. The construction of 201 Portage required the demolition of the Childs Building (also known as the McArthur Building) at 211 Portage. When the Childs Building was constructed in 1909, it was the tallest building in Winnipeg. A smaller twin building was planned but never built.

Originally built by the Toronto Dominion Bank, the skyscraper was acquired by Canwest to serve as the company's main corporate headquarters. Global Winnipeg (CKND-DT) moved its operations to 201 Portage on September 1, 2008. Having declared bankruptcy and sold its media properties, Canwest has vacated the premises; its main successor Shaw Media retained only the lease for the 30th floor, where the Global Winnipeg studios are located. On 11 January 2011, the Canwest sign and logo were removed.  The penthouse stayed vacant after Canwest's departure in November 2010, until late 2012 when RBC-Dominion Securities relocated to it from the Richardson Building.

Currently, the building is branded as "201 Portage". The building was managed by Creswin Properties, a real-estate company privately owned by the Asper family that owned Canwest, until early 2014. The building was acquired under new ownership in May 2014 and is owned by Portage & Main Development Ltd., a private corporation whose shareholders include 201 Portage Equities Inc. and Harvard Developments Inc.

Description 
It is  taller than the next tallest building in Winnipeg, the Richardson Building, which is located across the street. It is the tallest building between Hamilton and Calgary, and has been since its construction. 201 Portage is connected to Winnipeg Square and the Winnipeg Walkway system via an underground concourse. The building is certified as BOMA BEST level 3.

See also 
List of tallest buildings in Winnipeg

References

External links 

1990 establishments in Manitoba
Mass media company headquarters in Canada
Modernist architecture in Canada
Skyscraper office buildings in Canada
Skyscrapers in Winnipeg
Office buildings completed in 1990
Buildings and structures in downtown Winnipeg